The United States Miscellaneous Pacific Islands is an obsolete term used to collectively describe Baker Island, Howland Island, Jarvis Island, Kingman Reef, and Palmyra Atoll, all of them territories in the Pacific Ocean controlled by the United States by way of the Guano Islands Act.

For ISO purposes, the islands are now defined as part of the United States Minor Outlying Islands, together with Johnston Atoll, Midway Atoll, Navassa Island, and Wake Island, while each island is now given a separate FIPS code.

See also 
 United States Minor Outlying Islands
 United States Miscellaneous Caribbean Islands

External links 
 Changes in FIPS PUB 10

 
Islands of Oceania
Pacific islands of the United States
United States Minor Outlying Islands